Sir David Cecil Smith  (born 21 May 1930 Port Talbot, South Wales – 29 June 2018) was a British botanist. Smith was most notable for his research into the biology of symbiosis and became a leading authority on it. Smith discovered that lichens and Radiata (coelenterates) shared a similar biological mechanism in carbohydrate metabolism. Further research by Smith demonstrated similar processes in organisms that worked within a symbiotic relationship.

Early life and education
Smith was the youngest of two sons. His parents were William Smith, a mining engineer, and Elva (née Deeble) who was a teacher. Smith's brother Frank was killed in Canada. His father initially worked as a coal mining engineer in South Wales, before securing a position as the manager of a Manganese mine in Sinai desert following the UKGeneral Strike. The family remained in the Sinai desert until the end of World War II, except for occasional periods of leave. In one such period, Smith was born, and lived in the Sinai desert until he was five, when he returned to the UK to live with his grandparents and aunt, Iris, in Port Talbot where he attended primary school.

When Smith was ten he was sent to boarding school at Colston's School, Bristol. After his parents returned to the UK to live in Hatch End, London, when he was 15  Smith was moved to St Paul's School, London to continue his education. It was while St Paul's School, that his interest in the subject of biology started, while on field trips. He applied to study medicine at University of Oxford. However, he discovered that he could have financial support from a Browne scholarship to study botany at The Queen's College, Oxford, so he changed programme. He was awarded a Bachelor of Arts in Botany, achieving a First-class honours in 1951. Smith immediately followed this with postgraduate research on lichens and was awarded D.Phil in 1954.

Career and research
Smith completed his Doctor of Philosophy in two years, as his National service was impending. He spent his time in Germany, and joined the Intelligence Corps to research Nuclear warfare. Upon returning from national service, he was appointed to a research fellowship at The Queen's College, Oxford before visiting the United States under a Harkness Fellowship to conduct research at the University of California, Berkeley.

Smith returned to the United Kingdom to a post as a university lecturer in the Department of Agricultural Science at University of Oxford. Smith was then appointed as a Royal Society Senior research fellow at Wadham College, Oxford, from 1964 to 1971. From 1971 to 1974 Smith followed up that position at the same college as Tutorial Fellow (a senior Oxford academic rank), followed by Admissions Tutor at the same college. His former doctoral students include Angela Gallop.

In 1965, he joined the editorial board of the plant science journal New Phytologist. Shortly afterwards he became Executive Editor (Editor-in-Chief) for 17 years, and continuing as an Editor and serving as a Trustee until the late 1990s.

From 1974 to 1980 Smith held the Melville Wills Chair of Botany at the University of Bristol. Smith returned to a position at Oxford in 1980 as the Sibthorpian Professor of Rural Economy, named in honour of John Sibthorp. He also acted as director of the Department of Agricultural Science.

Between 1987 to 1994, Smith was Principal of the University of Edinburgh. From 1994 to September 2000 he was President of Wolfson College, Oxford He became an Honorary Fellow of Wadham College, Oxford in 2002.

He was a distinguished supporter of Humanists UK.

He was a member of the Advisory Council for the Campaign for Science and Engineering.

Honors and awards
Smith also received an honorary doctorate from Heriot-Watt University in 1993 He was elected as a fellow of the Royal Society in 1975 and was biological secretary from 1983 to 1987. He was awarded a knighthood in 1986. Smith was awarded the Gold Medal for Botany by the Linnean Society and served as president of the society from 2000 to 2003. In 2003 he received the Acharius Medal from the International Association for Lichenology.

Personal life
Smith married twice, firstly in 1959 to the plant physiologist Daphne Osborne, but they divorced in 1962. In 1965, he married Lesley Mutch, a Scottish doctor and epidemiologist and they had three children together, called Bryony, Adam and Cameron. Upon his retirement, the family returned to Morningside in Edinburgh in 2000.

References 

1930 births
2018 deaths
People from Port Talbot
Alumni of the University of Edinburgh
Alumni of The Queen's College, Oxford
Welsh scholars and academics
Academics of the University of Bristol
Principals of the University of Edinburgh
Presidents of Wolfson College, Oxford
Fellows of The Queen's College, Oxford
Fellows of the Royal Society of Edinburgh
Fellows of the Royal Society
Presidents of the Linnean Society of London
Knights Bachelor
Welsh botanists
British lichenologists
Acharius Medal recipients